Mahiwa can mean:
 Mahiwa (マヒワ) the Japanese name for Carduelis spinus, also known as the Eurasian siskin
 Mahiwa, Tanzania